This is a list of properties and districts in Lumpkin County, Georgia that are listed on the National Register of Historic Places (NRHP).

Current listings

|}

References

Lumpkin
Buildings and structures in Lumpkin County, Georgia